Kumari, or Kumari Devi, or the Living Goddess, is the tradition of worshipping a chosen virgin as manifestations of the divine female energy or Shakti in Dharmic religious traditions. It is believed that the girl is possessed by the goddess Taleju or Durga. The word Kumari is derived from Sanskrit meaning princess. The procession is akin to Indra or Sakra, taking Indrani to his celestial abode as his bride. The festival is celebrated during  Kumari Jantra, which follows the Indra Jatri religious ceremony. 

In Nepal, a Kumari is a prepubescent girl selected from the Shakya clan of the Nepalese Newari Buddhist community. The Kumari is revered and worshiped by some of the country's Hindus too. While there are several Kumaris throughout Nepal, with some cities having several, the best known is the Royal Kumari of Kathmandu, and she lives in the Kumari Ghar, a palace in the center of the city.  The selection process for her is especially rigorous.  As of 2017, the Royal Kumari of Kathmandu is Trishna Shakya, aged three, installed in September 2017. Unika Bajracharya, selected in April 2014 as the Kumari of Patan, is the second most important living goddess.

In Kathmandu Valley, this is a particularly prevalent practice. It is believed to be the incarnation of Taleju, a manifestation of the goddess Durga.  When her first menstruation begins, it is believed that the deity vacates her body. Serious illness or a major loss of blood from an injury also causes loss of deity.

The Kumari tradition is only followed in a few cities in Nepal, which are Kathmandu, Lalitpur (also called Patan), Bhaktapur, Sankhu and Bungamati. The selection process and roles of the Kumari vary between the different towns.

Philosophy and scriptures

The worship of the goddess in a young girl represents the worship of divine consciousness spread all over the creation. As the supreme goddess is thought to have manifested this entire cosmos out of her womb, she exists equally in animate as well as inanimate objects. While worship of an idol represents the worship and recognition of supreme through inanimate materials, worship of a human represents veneration and recognition of the same supreme in conscious beings.

In the Shakta text Devi Mahatmyam, or Chandi, the goddess is said to have declared that she resides in all female living beings in this universe. The entire ritual of Kumari is based on this verse. But while worshipping a goddess, only a young girl is chosen over a mature woman because of their inherent purity and chastity.

Hindu scriptures, such as the Jñanarnava Rudrayamala tantra, assign names to a Kumari depending on her age:

In Nepal, Kumaris are worshiped only for a day; these names are assigned only while the ritual lasts, often a few hours. Usually one cannot be a Kumari beyond 16 years of age because of menarche. In Bungamati, the Kumari reigns until her first milk tooth falls out.

The main target of a Kumari puja is to realize the potential divinity in every human being, mostly female. A Hindu spiritual aspirant sees the universal consciousness of humanity.

History in Nepal
Whilst the veneration of a living Kumari in Nepal is relatively recent, dating only from the 17th century, the tradition of Kumari-Puja, or virgin worship, has been around for much longer. There is evidence of virgin worship taking place in Nepal for more than 2,300 years. It appears to have taken hold in Nepal in the 6th century. There is written evidence describing the selection, ornamentation, and worship of the Kumari dating from the 13th century CE.

There are several legends telling how the current tradition of the Kumari began. Most of the legends, however, involve the tale of King Jayaprakash Malla, the last Nepalese king of the Malla Dynasty (12th–17th century CE). According to the most popular legend, a king and his friend, the goddess Taleju, approached his chambers late one night as he played tripasa, a dice game. The goddess came along every night to play the game with the condition that the king refrains from telling anyone about their meetings.

One night, the king's wife followed him to his chamber in order to find out who the king was meeting so often. The king's wife saw Taleju, and the goddess was angered. She told the king that if he wanted to see her again or have her protect his country, he would have to search for her among the Newari (Shakya) community of Ratnawali, as she would be incarnated as a little girl among them. Hoping to make amends with his patroness, King Jayaprakash Malla left the palace in search of the young girl who was possessed by Taleju.

Similarly, there is another story about the disappearance of Taleju. Some believe that the goddess visited King Trailokya Malla every night in the human form. Like other legendary stories, the king and the goddess played tripasa (dice) while discussing the welfare of the country. However, one night, King Trailokya Malla made sexual advances towards the goddess Taleju. As a result, the goddess in rage stopped visiting the palace. The king in regret worshiped and pleaded for her return. Finally, the goddess agreed to appear in the body of a virgin girl from the Shakya family.

Even today, a mother's dream of a red serpent is believed to be a portent of the elevation of her daughter to the position of Royal Kumari. And each year, the Nepalese King seeks the blessing of the Royal Kumari at the festival of Indra Jatra. This tradition has changed from 2008 A.D. with the country becoming one of the youngest republics in the world. 

A variation of this and other legends names King Gunkam Dev, a 12th-century ancestor of King Jayaprakash Malla, as the main character rather than Jayaprakash Malla.

A third variation of the legend says that during the reign of King Jayaprakash Malla, a young girl was banished from the city because it was feared that she was possessed by the goddess Durga. When the queen learned of the young girl's fate, she became enraged and insisted that the king fetch the girl and install her as the living incarnation of Durga.

Selection process

Once Taleju has left the sitting Kumari, there is a frenzy of activity to find her successor. The selection process is conducted by five senior Buddhist Vajracharya priests, the Panch Buddha, the Bada Guruju or Chief Royal Priest, Achajau, the priest of Taleju and the royal astrologer. The king and other religious leaders that might know of eligible candidates are also informed that a search is underway.

Eligible girls are from the Newar Shakya caste of silver and goldsmiths. She must be in excellent health, never have shed blood or been afflicted by any diseases, be without blemish and must not have yet lost any teeth. Girls who pass these basic eligibility requirements are examined for the battis lakshanas, or thirty-two perfections of a goddess. Some of these are poetically listed as such:

 A neck like a conch shell
 A body like a banyan tree
 Eyelashes like a cow
 Thighs like a deer
 Chest like a lion
 Voice soft and clear as a duck's

In addition to this, her hair and eyes should be very black, and she should have dainty hands and feet, small and well-recessed sexual organs and a set of twenty teeth.

The girl is also observed for signs of serenity and fearlessness, and her horoscope is examined to ensure that it is complementary to the king's. It is important that there not be any conflicts, as she must confirm the king's legitimacy each year of her divinity. Her family is also scrutinized to ensure its piety and devotion to the king.

Once the priests have chosen a candidate, she must undergo yet more rigorous tests to ensure that she indeed possesses the qualities necessary to be the living vessel of Durga. Her greatest test comes during the Hindu festival of Dashain, also known as Vijaya Dashami. On the Kalaratri, or "black night", 108 buffaloes and goats are sacrificed to the goddess Kali. The young candidate is taken into the Taleju temple and released into the courtyard, where the severed heads of the animals are illuminated by candlelight and masked men are dancing about. If the candidate truly possesses the qualities of Taleju, she shows no fear during this experience. If she does, another candidate is brought in to attempt the same thing.

In the next test, the living goddess must spend a night alone in a room among the heads of ritually slaughtered goats and buffaloes without showing fear. The fearless candidate has proven that she has the serenity and the fearlessness that typifies the goddess who is to inhabit her. After passing all other tests, the final test is that she must be able to pick out the personal belongings of the previous Kumari from an assortment of things laid out before her. If she is able to do so, there is no remaining doubt that she is the chosen one.

There are claims contrary to the commonly believed ritual and screening process, however.  The ex-Royal Kumari Rashmila Shakya states in her autobiography, From Goddess to Mortal, that this has nothing to do with the selection process, but rather is a ritual the Royal Kumari goes through each year, that there are no men dancing around in masks trying to scare her, and that at most, there are only a dozen or so decapitated animal heads in the scary room test.  She also describes the requisite physical examination of each Kumari as neither intimate nor rigorous.

Once the Kumari is chosen, she must be purified so that she can be an unblemished vessel for Taleju. She is taken by the priests to undergo a number of secret Tantric rituals to cleanse her body and spirit of her past experiences. Once these rituals are completed, Taleju enters her, and she is presented as the new Kumari. She is dressed and made up as a Kumari and then leaves the Taleju temple and walks across the square on a white cloth to the Kumari Ghar, which will be her home for the duration of her divinity.

Life of the Royal Kumari

Once the chosen girl completes the Tantric purification rites and crosses from the temple on a white cloth to the Kumari Ghar to assume her throne, her life takes on an entirely new character. She will leave her palace only on ceremonial occasions. Her family will visit her rarely, and then only in a formal capacity. Her playmates will be drawn from a narrow pool of Newari children from her caste, usually the children of her caretakers. She will always be dressed in red and gold, wear her hair in a topknot and have the agni chakshu, or "fire eye", painted on her forehead as a symbol of her special powers of perception.

The Royal Kumari's new life is vastly different from the one to which she has been accustomed in her short life. Whilst her life is now free of material troubles, she has ceremonial duties to carry out. Although she is not ordered about, she is expected to behave as befits a goddess. She has shown the correct qualities during the selection process, and her continued serenity is of paramount importance; an ill-tempered goddess is believed to portend bad tidings for those petitioning her.

The Kumari's walk across the Durbar Square is the last time her feet will touch the ground until such time as the goddess departs from her body. From now on, when she ventures outside of her palace, she will be carried or transported in her golden palanquin. Her feet, like all of her, are now sacred. Petitioners will touch them, hoping to receive respite from troubles and illnesses. The king himself will kiss them each year when he comes to seek her blessing. She will never wear shoes; if her feet are covered at all, they will be covered with red stockings.

The power of the Kumari is perceived to be so strong that even a glimpse of her is believed to bring good fortune. Crowds of people wait below the Kumari's window in the Kumari Chowk, or courtyard, of her palace, hoping that she will pass by the latticed windows on the third floor and glance down at them. Even though her irregular appearances last only a few seconds, the atmosphere in the courtyard is charged with devotion and awe when they do occur.

The more fortunate, or better connected, petitioners visit the Kumari in her chambers, where she sits upon a gilded lion throne. Many of those visiting her are people suffering from blood or menstrual disorders since the Kumari is believed to have special power over such illnesses. She is also visited by bureaucrats and other government officials. Petitioners customarily bring gifts and food offerings to the Kumari, who receives them in silence. Upon arrival, she offers them her feet to touch or kiss as an act of devotion. During these audiences, the Kumari is closely watched, and her actions interpreted as a prediction of the petitioners' lives, as follows:

 Crying or loud laughter: Serious illness or death
 Weeping or rubbing eyes: Imminent death
 Trembling: Imprisonment
 Hand clapping: Reason to fear the king
 Picking at food offerings: Financial losses

If the Kumari remains silent and impassive throughout the audience, her devotees leave elated. This is the sign that their wishes have been granted.

Many people attend to the Kumari's needs. These people are known as the Kumarimi and are headed by the patron. Their job is very difficult. They must attend to the Kumari's every need and desire while giving her instruction in her ceremonial duties. While they cannot directly order her to do anything, they must guide her through her life. They are responsible for bathing her, dressing her and attending to her makeup as well as preparing her for her visitors and for ceremonial occasions.

Traditionally, the Kumari received no education, as she was widely considered to be omniscient. However, modernization has made it necessary for her to have an education once she re-enters mortal life. Kumaris are now allowed to attend public schools and have a life inside the classroom that is no different from that of other students. While many kumaris, such as the Kumari of Bhaktapur, attend school, others, such as the main kumari in Kathmandu, receive their education through private tutors.

Similarly, her limited playmates must learn to respect her. Since her every wish must be granted, they must learn to surrender to her whatever they have that she may want and to defer to her wishes in what games to play or activities to play.

List of Kumaris

Controversy
On 3 July 2007, Sajani Shakya was removed from her position as Kumari of Bhaktapur after visiting the United States to attend the release of the movie Living Goddess at Silverdocs, the American Film Institute/Discovery Channel documentary festival in downtown Silver Spring, Maryland. The visit, according to the elders, had tainted her purity. A couple of weeks later, temple authorities at Sajani Shakya's hometown recanted their previous statement and said that she would not be stripped of her title because she was willing to undergo a "cleansing" ceremony to remove any sins she might have committed while traveling.

Popular culture
 The Kumari was featured in the 25 October 2015 episode of the CBS drama series Madam Secretary (season 2, episode 4), titled "Waiting for Taleju". In the episode, fictional US Secretary of State Elizabeth McCord meets with the Kumari in hopes of gaining support for a deal that will help secure US disaster relief funds in the wake of the April 2015 Nepal earthquake.

 In the Korean webtoon series For the Sake of Sita, the female lead character was a Kumari in Nepal.

 In the novel The Lives of Christopher Chant by Diana Wynne Jones, the character of the Living Asheth is a little girl worshipped as a goddess in one of the worlds visited by the main character and is based heavily on the Kumari, being the incarnation of a goddess and having to live by strict rules of ritual purity.

 In the Netflix limited series The Serpent episode 4, Monique sees a Kumari girl from outside of the temple.
 In the 2016 Indian film Kaashmora, The reincarnation of Rathna Mahadevi (Nayanthara's character), is portrayed as a girl dressed like a Kumari.

See also 

 Indrani
 Devi Kanya Kumari 
 Kaumari
 Kanwari
 Matrikas

References

 
 Shakya, Durga, Kumari House. Retrieved 12 July 2004 from

External links

 Nepal Information: Details about Kumari Devi
 Bhaktapur Kumari visits US – photos and video of Kumari visiting the US
 PhotoEssay- Kumari-virgin-goddess
 7-year-old girl declared as Royal Kumari of Kathmandu - published at 2016-Sep-09; retrieved at 2016-Dec-13.

Hindu goddesses
Virgin goddesses
Temples in Nepal
Newar
Buddhism in Nepal
Hinduism in Nepal
Hinduism and children
Buddhism and children
Nepalese religious leaders
Female buddhas and supernatural beings
Deified women
Social history of Nepal